Fonotoe Nuafesili Pierre Lauofo Meredith is a Samoan politician a who has served as the leader of the opposition since 2023. A former deputy prime minister, he is a member of the Human Rights Protection Party. 

Lauofo was first elected to the Legislative Assembly of Samoa in a by-election in 2005. He was re-elected in the 2006 Samoan general election. 

He was re-elected unopposed at the 2011 election after the candidate from the opposition Tautua Samoa Party was declared ineligible, and appointed Deputy Prime Minister and Minister of Labour, Industry and Commerce. In January 2014 he was charged with obstructing police after instructing Associate Minister Muagututagata Peter Ah Him to drive away from a police breath test. In April 2014 he was convicted, and fined US$90. The conviction was overturned in 2017. In the intervening period Lauofo was re-elected in the 2016 election, but was not reappointed to Cabinet.

Lauofo was re-elected at the 2021 election. Following the election, he was elected HRPP deputy leader.

On 27 January 2023, parliament elected Fonotoe as opposition leader, succeeding Tuila‘epa Sa‘ilele Malielegaoi whose tenure was terminated due to his suspension from the legislature.

References

Members of the Legislative Assembly of Samoa
Living people
Deputy Prime Ministers of Samoa
Government ministers of Samoa
Human Rights Protection Party politicians
Year of birth missing (living people)